Rigvedi (also called Rugvedi)   is an Indian surname used by Deshastha Rigvedi Brahmin (DRB) community, meaning versed in Rigveda. It is one of the two major sub-sects among Deshastha Brahmins. Similarly there are Yajurvedi (one who knows Yajurveda).

Geographical distribution
As of 2014, 90.32% of all known bearers of the surname Rigvedi were residents of India. The frequency of the surname was higher than national average in the following states:
 1. Maharashtra 
 2. Karnataka

See also
Yajurvedi
Dwivedi
Trivedi
Upreti
Chaturvedi

References

Indian surnames
Brahmin communities